Josip Posavec (born 10 March 1996) is a Croatian footballer who plays as a goalkeeper for AaB.

Career

Palermo
On 31 August 2015, the Serie A club Palermo announced that they had finalised the signing of Posavec, and that he will join the Italian club at the end of the football season 2015/2016. However on 26 January 2016, Palermo announced that Posavec would join the club already in January, to replace Simone Colombi who left for Carpi.

Hajduk Split 
On 7 July 2018, Posavec returned to the Croatian First Football League, signing for HNK Hajduk Split on a one-year loan deal. Posavec made his debut for Hajduk on 26 July 2017 in a 1-0 victory over PFC Slavia Sofia in the second round of 2018-19 UEFA Europa League qualifying phase, earning plaudits for his performance. Posavec made 33 appearances for Hajduk in all competitions.

On 8 June 2019, Hajduk announced that they had signed Posavec from Palermo on a permanent, four-year deal.

References

External links
 

1996 births
Living people
Sportspeople from Varaždin
Association football goalkeepers
Croatian footballers
Croatia youth international footballers
Croatia under-21 international footballers
NK Inter Zaprešić players
Palermo F.C. players
HNK Hajduk Split players
AaB Fodbold players
Croatian Football League players
First Football League (Croatia) players
Serie A players
Serie B players
Danish Superliga players
Croatian expatriate footballers
Expatriate footballers in Italy
Croatian expatriate sportspeople in Italy
Expatriate men's footballers in Denmark
Croatian expatriate sportspeople in Denmark